Kyle Thomas Busch is an American professional stock car racing driver and team owner. As of 2023, Busch drives full-time in the No. 8 Chevrolet Camaro ZL1 for Richard Childress Racing in the NASCAR Cup Series and part-time in the No. 10 Chevrolet Camaro for Kaulig Racing in the NASCAR Xfinity Series and part-time in the NASCAR Camping World Truck Series, driving the No. 51 Chevrolet Silverado for Kyle Busch Motorsports. KBM runs multiple trucks in the Truck Series. Busch is the 2009 NASCAR Nationwide Series champion and the 2015 and 2019 Cup Series champion, while driving full-time in the No. 18 Toyota Camry for Joe Gibbs Racing.

During his career Kyle Busch drove for Hendrick Motorsports in the Cup Series from 2003-2007 and for Joe Gibbs Racing from 2008-2022. In the Xfinity Series Kyle Busch drove for Hendrick Motorsports from 2003-2007. Joe Gibbs Motorsports, Braun Racing, and D'Hondt Humphrey Motorsports in 2008. Joe Gibbs Racing only from 2009-2011, Kyle Busch Motorsports in 2012, and Joe Gibbs Racing from 2013-2021. In the Truck Series Busch drove for Roush Racing in 2001, Morgan-Dollar Motorsports in a one-off event at Lucas Oil Indianapolis Raceway Park in 2004, Billy Ballew Motorsports from 2005-2009, and Kyle Busch Motorsports from 2010 to the present.

Hendrick Motorsports: 2003-2007
Busch entered the  NASCAR Nationwide Series in 2003  as a development driver for Hendrick Motorsports after leaving Roush Racing's developmental program; he ran seven ARCA RE/MAX Series races for the team, scoring his first career win at Nashville Superspeedway in April, and winning again at Kentucky Speedway in May.

Having turned 18 in early May, he resumed his NASCAR career, driving seven Busch Series races in the No. 87 Chevrolet for NEMCO Motorsports. He posted two-second-place finishes in the seven races, including in his debut at Lowe's Motor Speedway, and again at Darlington Raceway. In November, Busch was set to make his cup debut in the No. 60 Chevrolet for Hendrick Motorsports at Homestead before having to withdraw from the race after not having a backup available after failing pre-race tech.

2004: Xfinity Series Rookie of the Year 
Busch began his 2004 season by competing in the ARCA Re/MAX Series 200-mile race at Daytona International Speedway; he won the event, beating Frank Kimmel for the win. He began his first full-time Busch Series season in 2004, replacing Brian Vickers in the No. 5 Chevrolet with sponsorship from Lowe's. Busch scored his first career pole in the series in the fourth race of the year at Darlington Raceway, and his first career win in May at Richmond International Raceway in the Funai 250. Busch won four additional races, tying Greg Biffle for the record for most wins by a driver in their rookie year, and finished 2nd in points behind series champion Martin Truex Jr. and easily won the Rookie of the Year award for the Xfinity series

Busch also made his debut in the Nextel Cup Series in 2004, driving the No. 84 Chevrolet for Hendrick Motorsports. He attempted to qualify for nine races in 2004, qualifying for six events with his first being at his home track of Las Vegas Motor Speedway; he posted a best finish of 24th at California Speedway.

2005: Cup Series Rookie of the Year
In October 2004, it was announced that Busch would be competing full-time in the Nextel Cup Series for Hendrick Motorsports starting in 2005, replacing Terry Labonte in the No. 5 Chevrolet as Labonte semi-retired to run a partial season. Busch won his first career Sprint Cup race at California Speedway in September, winning the Sony HD 500; at the time he was the youngest winner in the history of the series, at an age of 20 years, 4 months and 2 days, four days younger than previous record-holder Donald Thomas. Busch won his 2nd race of the season later in the year at Phoenix International Raceway, on his way to finishing 20th in series points and winning the Nextel Cup Series Rookie of the Year title. Busch also became the youngest pole-sitter in Nextel Cup Series history when he was the fastest qualifier for the Auto Club 500 at California Speedway in February.

Busch also competed on a limited basis in the Busch Series and Craftsman Truck Series in 2005, in Busch Series competition he ran fourteen races, winning at Lowe's Motor Speedway in May; he won three races in eleven starts in the Craftsman Truck Series for Billy Ballew Motorsports; his first career win, at Lowe's Motor Speedway on May 20, 2005, made Busch the youngest winner in series history at the time.

2006: First Chase Appearance
Busch scored one Nextel Cup Series win in 2006, taking the checkered flag in the Lenox Industrial Tools 300 at New Hampshire International Speedway. Busch qualified for the Chase for the Nextel Cup for the first time in his career by finishing second at Richmond International Raceway in September, moving into the top ten in points, he finished the year tenth in points, 448 behind series champion Jimmie Johnson.

In the NASCAR Busch Series, Busch ran all but one race over the season, winning the spring race at Bristol Motor Speedway, and finishing seventh in points; in the Craftsman Truck Series, Busch competed in seven races, winning the Quaker Steak and Lube 200 at Lowe's Motor Speedway, Busch's truck was painted to resemble the Rowdy Burns car from the movie Days of Thunder.

2007: Final Year with Hendrick Motorsports
In 2007, Busch became the first Nextel Cup Series driver to win in the Car of Tomorrow, winning the Food City 500 at Bristol Motor Speedway in March over Jeff Burton, despite winning, Busch stated an intense dislike of the Car of Tomorrow after the race. The win was the 200th NASCAR national touring series win for Hendrick Motorsports, the 600th NASCAR victory for Chevrolet, and the first win for a Chevrolet Impala in NASCAR since Wendell Scott won at Speedway Park in Jacksonville, Florida in December 1963. At Texas Motor Speedway in April, Busch left the track without informing his team after an accident; Dale Earnhardt Jr. was asked by the team to relief-drive once the car was repaired. Later at Talladega Superspeedway in the Busch Series Aaron's 312, Busch flipped his car seven times in a wreck with Tony Stewart and Casey Mears, causing his HANS device to crack from the force of the wreck.

In the Nextel All-Star Challenge at Lowe's Motor Speedway in May, Busch and older brother Kurt were involved in an accident while racing for the win, knocking each other out of the race; afterwards the brothers were angry with each other, Kurt joking that "I won't be eating any Kellogg's soon", referencing Kyle's sponsor, and Kyle refusing to be interviewed. Both drivers were warned to avoid further incidents; while the brothers later stated that they were reconciling, it was later revealed that the two refused to speak to each other until their grandmother spoke with them at the family Thanksgiving dinner later that year.

On June 15, 2007, it was announced Busch would be leaving Hendrick Motorsports after the end of the 2007 season. A contract extension had been proposed, but instead Dale Earnhardt Jr. was signed to replace Busch starting with the 2008 season. Busch stated that the decision to terminate his contract had been mutual, but it had been influenced by a change in agent. On July 7, 2007, Busch battled Jamie McMurray in the Pepsi 400, finishing second to McMurray by only 0.005 seconds. In August, Busch announced that he would be joining Joe Gibbs Racing for the 2008 season, replacing J. J. Yeley in the No. 18 Toyota. His tenure with Hendrick Motorsports ended at Homestead with a 20th place finish and a 5th place finish in the final standings.

Busch also ran nineteen Busch Series races in 2007, winning four times and finishing sixteenth in points, he raced eleven times in the Craftsman Truck Series for Billy Ballew Motorsports, scoring two wins.

Joe Gibbs Racing: 2008-2022

2008: Strong Regular Season that ends with a Chase Collapse

Busch started his association with Joe Gibbs Racing by leading the most laps in the 50th Daytona 500, finishing 4th, he posted another 4th-place finish the following week at Auto Club Speedway, becoming the series points leader for the first time in his career. At Atlanta Motor Speedway in the Kobalt Tools 500, Busch scored his first win with JGR and the first Sprint Cup points-race win for Toyota. At Richmond International Raceway Busch became involved in an incident with Dale Earnhardt Jr. with three laps to go, spinning Earnhardt and letting Clint Bowyer by to win; the move resulted in Busch being vilified by fans of Earnhardt Jr.

Busch won Sprint Cup races at Talladega Superspeedway, Darlington Raceway, Dover International Speedway, Infineon Raceway, Daytona International Speedway, Chicagoland Speedway and Watkins Glen International over the summer of 2008, in August at Bristol Motor Speedway, Busch was bumped out of the way after dominating the race by Carl Edwards, who went on to win; after the race Busch began bumping Edwards' car to express his displeasure, and Edwards retaliated by spinning Busch to cheers from the crowd. Both drivers were placed on probation for the incident.

Busch entered the Chase leading the points standings, but consecutive poor finishes at New Hampshire Motor Speedway and Dover International Speedway dropped Busch from a 20-point lead to twelfth in points; Busch rallied to finish tenth at the end of the season, with a then career-high eight wins and twenty-one top-tens.

Busch also ran in thirty Nationwide Series races during the 2008 season; he teamed with Denny Hamlin, Joey Logano and Tony Stewart helped win the 2008 Nationwide series owners' championship for Joe Gibbs Racing in the No. 20 Toyota. Busch competed for three different teams over the course of the Nationwide Series season, driving four different cars; and winning at least 1 race in 3 of the cars (the other was a one-off race). He collected ten race wins, four pole positions, twenty top tens and eighteen top fives during the year; his 10 wins tied the Nationwide series record for most wins in a season, set by Sam Ard 24 years earlier. The cars he drove during the year were the No. 18 and 20 for his cup team Joe Gibbs Racing, the No. 32 of Braun Racing, a fellow Toyota team that was an independent xfinity team, and the No. 92 of D’hont Motorsports (his ride with D’hont was a one-off race).

In the Craftsman Truck Series, Busch finished second in the Chevy Silverado 250 at Daytona International Speedway, and followed it up a week later with a win in the San Bernardino County 200 at the newly renamed Auto Club Speedway in Fontana, California. Two weeks later at Atlanta, he raced to another win in the American Commercial Lines 200; his third and final win of the 2008 truck series season came at Bristol Motor Speedway on August 20, 2008.

2009: Xfinity Series Championship And Missing The Chase
Busch started his 2009 season with a win at Daytona International Speedway in his Gatorade Duel qualifying race for the Daytona 500, he led the most laps in the Daytona 500 but was involved in the big one and failed to finish the race. The next week at Auto Club Speedway, Busch became the first driver in NASCAR history to win two national touring series races in the same day, winning the Truck Series San Bernardino County 200 and Nationwide Series Stater Brothers 300. Busch then won Sprint Cup races at Las Vegas Motor Speedway and Bristol Motor Speedway.On May 2, 2009, Busch became the second driver in Sprint Cup Series history to win a race on his birthday, after Cale Yarborough, with a win in the Crown Royal Presents the Russ Friedman 400 at Richmond International Raceway. In the Coke Zero 400 at Daytona International Speedway, Busch was involved in a violent wreck while attempting to block Tony Stewart to win, Stewart won the race but apologized in victory circle for the wreck. Busch went on to win his fourth race of the season at Bristol Motor Speedway in August; he missed qualifying for the Chase for the Sprint Cup by eight points to Brian Vickers.
In the Dickies 500 at Texas Motor Speedway, Busch was leading with 3 laps to go, and it looked like he would sweep all 3 races at Texas that weekend for the first time, but he ran out of fuel and his brother Kurt Busch took the trophy.

Busch ran the entire 2009 NASCAR Nationwide Series schedule, making it the first time he had done so since his rookie year in 2004. In the 2009 Nationwide Series finale at Homestead-Miami Speedway on November 21, 2009, Busch won the race, clinching his first NASCAR Championship; having won nine races over the course of the season, he was the first driver since Sam Ard in 1983 to win the season finale and the championship in the same year. He tallied nine wins, twenty five top fives, and thirty top tens. Busch also won seven races in the Camping World Truck Series during the 2009 season. He also competed in a single Camping World East Series event at Iowa Speedway, winning the race from the pole.

2010

On December 11, 2009, Busch announced the formation of Kyle Busch Motorsports, planning to field two teams in the NASCAR Camping World Truck Series in 2010. The No. 18 Toyota Tundra was to be driven by Busch part-time, with the remainder of races to be driven by Brian Ickler, and the second truck, given No. 56, was to be driven by Tayler Malsam. However, after both Ickler and Malsam accepted jobs to drive in the Nationwide Series, and while suffering financial troubles due to lack of sponsorship, Busch withdrew the No. 56 from competition; Johnny Benson Jr. and Kasey Kahne drove the No. 18 when Busch wasn't driving it himself.

On August 21, 2010, Busch became the first driver in NASCAR history to win all three NASCAR national touring series events run in a single weekend. This was achieved at Bristol Motor Speedway, where Busch won in the Camping World Truck Series, Nationwide Series, and Sprint Cup Series events over a four-day period. Busch was described as "an ass" in driver introductions for the Cup race by fellow NASCAR star, Brad Keselowski, who Busch had intentionally wrecked in the Nationwide Series race the previous night.

On November 7, 2010, at Texas Motor Speedway, Busch spun midway through the race, and while pitting to change tires sped on pit road. While serving a penalty his in-car camera caught Busch flip the finger to the officials; he was penalized two additional laps for the gesture, and was later fined $25,000 in addition to being placed on probation through the end of the year.

In the Nationwide Series he won 13 races in 2010, breaking the all-time record for most Nationwide Series wins in a season previously held by Sam Ard with 10. Busch also won three Cup Series and eight Truck Series races in 2010, including a win at Talladega Superspeedway over Aric Almirola by 0.002 seconds, the closest finish in Camping World Truck Series history since the introduction of electronic scoring. His No. 18 Truck Series team won the 2010 owners' championship in the series.

2011: Second Chase Collapse 

Busch's 2011 Sprint Cup Series season began with a wreck in the Budweiser Shootout at Daytona International Speedway. Busch also raced in all three NASCAR points events at Daytona, with a best finish of fifth in the Truck Series event; the next week at Phoenix, Busch dominated the Truck Series race, and led every lap of the race in the Nationwide Series Bashas' Supermarkets 200. He was close to sweep all 3 races at Phoenix again, but Jeff Gordon overtook him with 9 laps to go and took the trophy. Busch swept the March weekend at Bristol, his second sweep of a Bristol weekend. On April 30, 2011, Busch won his third straight spring race at Richmond International Raceway, capturing his second win of the 2011 season.

Following an on-track incident with Kevin Harvick during the Southern 500 on May 7, 2011, and a post-race scuffle that saw Busch push Harvick's unoccupied car on pit road with his car, Busch and Harvick were fined $25,000 and put on probation for four races, in addition to the Sprint All-Star Race. Following the Truck Series O'Reilly Auto Parts 250 at Kansas Speedway, Busch became involved in an altercation with Richard Childress; Busch had bumped Childress' No. 22 truck, driven by Joey Coulter, on the race's cooldown lap, and according to witnesses about 30 minutes after the race Childress came up to Busch, put him in a head lock and started punching him. Childress had previously stated, following Busch's altercation with Harvick at Darlington, that he would consider it personal if Busch damaged another vehicle he owned; Childress was fined $150,000 for the incident, and placed on probation for the remainder of the year. Busch stated that the bump had been congratulatory, and that had he realised the resulting damage would upset Childress he would have paid for the repairs.

Busch won the inaugural Sprint Cup race at Kentucky Speedway on July 9, 2011, beating David Reutimann and Jimmie Johnson; at Watkins Glen in August, Busch led the most laps but lost the lead to Marcos Ambrose during a green-white-checkered finish. The following week Busch won the Pure Michigan 400 at Michigan International Speedway, becoming the first driver that season to clinch a spot in the Chase for the Sprint Cup.

On August 24, 2011, while competing in the Truck Series O'Reilly 200 at Bristol Motor Speedway, Busch was hit by the Joe Denette Motorsports truck of Elliott Sadler, sending him into the wall and causing severe damage to his truck, while waiting for the caution flag to be displayed, Busch drove rapidly around the track and hit Sadler, spinning him. Busch stated afterwards that Sadler, a regular driver for Kevin Harvick in the Nationwide Series, deliberately crashed him due to his connection with Harvick, who at the time was feuding with Busch in the Sprint Cup Series, Sadler and Harvick denied any connection, and no penalties were assessed for the incident.

On August 26, 2011, Busch won the Nationwide Series Food City 250 at Bristol Motor Speedway, surpassing Mark Martin for the most Nationwide series wins ever, with 50, and also simultaneously became the first driver to win three consecutive races at Bristol Motor Speedway in the Nationwide Series. The race also had the closest finish at Bristol in series history, 0.019 seconds over teammate Joey Logano.

Hornaday incident

On November 4, 2011, Busch was involved in an incident during the Camping World Truck Series WinStar World Casino 350K at Texas Motor Speedway. While passing the lapped truck of Johnny Chapman, Busch made contact with series regular and championship contender Ron Hornaday Jr., causing a caution flag to be displayed. While under the yellow flag, Busch drove to Hornaday's truck during the caution and deliberately turned him into the outside wall, smashing Hornaday's truck and ending Hornaday's title hopes. NASCAR immediately black-flagged Busch and parked him for the remainder of the race for his aggressive driving; this was the first case of this being done since Robby Gordon was parked in a 2007 Nationwide Series race at Circuit Gilles Villeneuve. Busch declined comment after speaking with NASCAR officials, Hornaday stated "I'll be at his house Monday morning" if Busch was not suspended.

The next morning, NASCAR president Mike Helton announced, following discussion with Busch and team owner Joe Gibbs, that Busch would remain parked for the remainder of the weekend, including the Nationwide Series O'Reilly Auto Parts Challenge and the Sprint Cup AAA Texas 500. Denny Hamlin replaced Busch in the Nationwide Series event, while Michael McDowell drove Busch's No. 18 in the AAA Texas 500. Helton took this action under an "emergency-only" rule that allows NASCAR to park a driver in order to ensure the "orderly conduct of the event." Since this was not considered a suspension under NASCAR rules, Busch could not appeal the decision. It was the second time since the Truck Series was launched in 1995 that NASCAR has parked a driver across national series (In 2002, during a Craftsman Truck Series race at Martinsville, Kevin Harvick was parked for aggressive driving, when he said over the radio that he will "kill" Coy Gibbs. A few moments later, he spun him out intentionally. He was parked for the Winston Cup race at Martinsville.) and only the third cross-series sanction in NASCAR's 64-year history. NASCAR's action mathematically eliminated Busch from contention for the Sprint Cup, though any realistic chance of him winning the championship had ended races prior. Later that day, Busch issued an apology for his actions, saying that the Texas incident was "certainly a step backward." In addition, Busch offered to let Hornaday, his Kevin Harvick Incorporated team closing at the end of the season, drive his No. 18 truck in 2012; Hornaday declined the offer due to his long-standing relationship with Chevrolet.

On November 7, 2011, NASCAR fined Busch $50,000 for "actions detrimental to stock car racing", in addition, Busch was placed on probation for the rest of the year, being warned that he would be suspended indefinitely if he committed another offense detrimental to stock car racing or disrupted the orderly conduct of a NASCAR event during the remainder of the 2011 season.

On November 10, 2011, it was reported that M&M's, the primary sponsor for Busch's Sprint Cup team, refused to sponsor the 18 for the last few races as a result of Busch's behavior in Texas. Aric Almirola was briefly considered by Joe Gibbs Racing to replace Busch for the remainder of the year, while it was decided by the team to allow Busch to drive in the final two races of the season with Interstate Batteries sponsorship, Busch was replaced in the team's Nationwide Series car for the final race of the year at Homestead-Miami Speedway by the request of the team's sponsor, Z-Line Designs. Busch was subsequently replaced by Denny Hamlin as had occurred previously at Texas.

2012: Missing the chase again

Busch started the 2012 season announcing he would be moving, in the Nationwide Series, from running for Joe Gibbs Racing to running only a limited schedule races in cars prepared by his own Kyle Busch Motorsports team, driving alongside his brother Kurt, in addition to cutting back his Truck Series schedule to only three races.

His 2012 season in the Sprint Cup Series began with a win in the Budweiser Shootout at Daytona International Speedway, his first win in the event; his margin of victory over Tony Stewart, 0.013 seconds, was the closest in the event's history. However Busch's only win in a Sprint Cup points event during the year came at Richmond in the Capital City 400 in April, the fourth straight year he won the event; he nearly won at Watkins Glen International before, on the final lap, hitting oil on the track from Bobby Labonte's car and being spun by Brad Keselowski, giving the win to Marcos Ambrose. He finished 7th. He failed to make the Chase for the Sprint Cup, finishing 13th in Sprint Cup points, and was winless in Nationwide Series and Camping World Truck Series competition. Despite the fact he was not in the Chase, he did well in the final ten races, accumulating 7 top 5 and 8 top 10 finishes. He also dominated a few races - He led the most laps at Dover International Speedway, but had to pit for fuel with 10 laps to go and gave up the lead to Brad Keselowski who gambled and won the race. He was close to his first win at Martinsville Speedway, but he could not overtake Jimmie Johnson in the final laps. He led the most laps at Phoenix International Raceway, but the last caution gave the trophy to Kevin Harvick. In the season finale, he also led the most laps at Homestead-Miami Speedway, but had to service the car for fuel, resulting in Jeff Gordon winning.

2013: Return to the Chase
Heading into the 2013 season, Busch merged his No. 54 Nationwide Series team with Joe Gibbs Racing as part of a multi-year contract extension with the team. Kyle continued to field his own No. 77 Toyota in the Nationwide Series with driver Parker Kligerman.

Busch began the 2013 racing season with a crash in the Sprint Unlimited at Daytona International Speedway. In qualifying for the 2013 Daytona 500, he won his Budweiser Duel qualifying race; Busch ran as high as second in the Daytona 500 before blowing an engine after 150 of the race's 200 laps. At Phoenix International Raceway, Busch won the Nationwide Series Dollar General 200 from the pole, ending the second-longest winless streak of his career, at Bristol Motor Speedway two weeks later, he won the Jeff Foxworthy's Grit Chips 300 at Bristol Motor Speedway by less than .025 seconds over rookie Kyle Larson, tying Kevin Harvick for the most wins at Bristol in the Nationwide Series. That same weekend, Busch won the Sprint Cup pole, setting a new track qualifying record. He finished second to eventual winner Kasey Kahne after rallying back from a speeding penalty.

At Fontana, Busch dominated the weekend, winning both the Nationwide and Sprint Cup races; in the Sprint Cup race he passed a crashing Joey Logano and Denny Hamlin for the win. Busch won his second Sprint Cup pole of the season at Texas, narrowly beating elder brother Kurt to do so. Busch swept the Nationwide Series and Sprint Cup Series races at the track, his seventh weekend sweep. He and Logano both had a nasty crash at Kansas Speedway, in which Busch spun out and collided with the No. 22, destroying the front ends of both cars. No one was injured, but the crash ended both drivers' days due to the amount of damage their cars suffered. However, they were credited finishing 38th and 39th respectively. Busch later went on to finish 24th at Richmond and then 37th at Talladega, he dominated the Southern 500 at Darlington after winning the previous night's Nationwide Series race before dropping back to sixth at the finish having suffered a cut tire. It was later revealed that he finished the race with only 12 pounds of air left in the cut tire.

At Charlotte, in the Nationwide Series, Busch was back in the winner's circle at History 300 at Charlotte Motor Speedway, having already won at the track in the North Carolina Education Lottery 200 for the Camping World Truck Series the previous weekend. The next day at the Coca-Cola 600 in the Sprint Cup Series, Busch had qualified in 8th, and was leading when an unusual incident occurred on lap 121: One of the cables to a FOX Sports cable camera on the front straightaway snapped and fell on the track in the turn 4 grandstands, injuring 10 spectators. Busch ran over it, as did Mark Martin, Marcos Ambrose and several others, suffering damage to the underside of his car. A red flag was waved, but while under normal red flag conditions, crews are not allowed to touch the cars, enough cars took damage from hitting the cable that NASCAR gave all teams 15 minutes to check for damage and do any repairs if needed. At the restart, all cars returned to the position they were in. On lap 258, Busch's engine blew, ending his night and finishing him in 38th place.

Busch finished 4th in the Sprint Cup race the following weekend at Dover, then 6th at Pocono Raceway, and 4th at Michigan International Speedway before spinning twice in the first road-course event of the year at Sonoma Raceway and finishing 35th. He finished 5th at Kentucky Speedway, then at Daytona International Speedway for the Coke Zero 400 he won his first-ever pole at a restrictor plate track in any NASCAR series. He was collected in a last-lap wreck, finishing 12th.

Busch won his seventh Nationwide Series event of the season at New Hampshire Motor Speedway, leading 130 of 200 laps. He finished second in the following day's Sprint Cup race, becoming involved in a feud with Ryan Newman, calling Newman "the biggest stupid idiot out there" following an on-track run-in with brother Kurt Busch.

Two weeks later, Busch won the second running of the Nationwide Series Indiana 250 at Indianapolis Motor Speedway from the pole, leading the most laps in the race and passing Brian Scott with two laps remaining for the win. He then won two weeks later in the Sprint Cup Series at Watkins Glen International, a fortunate pit strategy helping him beat Brad Keselowski and Martin Truex Jr. to win. After finishing 31st at Michigan, Busch won the Truck Series and Nationwide Series races at Bristol Motor Speedway, then started last in the Sprint Cup race after a spin in qualifying, finishing eleventh.

After a second-place finish in the Nationwide Series race at Atlanta Motor Speedway, Busch won the Sprint Cup Series AdvoCare 500 at the track, taking the lead with thirty laps to go and beating Joey Logano for the victory, securing a spot in the Chase for the Sprint Cup. This was Busch's 28th career win tying him with Rex White for 23rd place on the all-time wins list.

Busch then ended the regular season with a 19th-place finish at Richmond.

Busch opened the Chase with runner-up finishes to Matt Kenseth at Chicagoland and New Hampshire. He then had a fifth-place finish at Dover.

Busch's bad luck at Kansas continued in the fall. Both he and brother Kurt wrecked their primary cars in practice, forcing both to start from the back of the field in backup cars. While Kurt managed to charge through the field to finish second, Kyle spun out on the first lap trying to avoid a wrecking Danica Patrick and David Reutimann in turn 1. Busch then had to struggle with a poor handling racecar for most of the day. On lap 188, Busch was spun by Juan Pablo Montoya in turn 4. 12 laps later, on a restart from Marcos Ambrose's spin, Busch's day was ended prematurely when he was tapped by Carl Edwards and turned into Brian Vickers, then shot up head-on into the turn 2 wall, destroying the front part of his car and leaving him with a 34th-place finish. Despite this, Busch finished fourth in the final points, his best career point finish at the time.

2014: Good Nationwide Season and Mediocre Cup season

In 2014, Busch announced that he would drive the No. 54 car part-time in the Nationwide Series for Joe Gibbs Racing, splitting the ride with Sam Hornish Jr. He also stated that he would drive the No. 51 truck part-time for 10 races in the Camping World Truck Series, with Erik Jones driving the other 12.

Kyle Busch's first highlight of the season came at Daytona in the NASCAR truck series race. He took the lead half-way in the 100 lap event, after leader Ben Kennedy (grandson of Bill France Jr.) ran out of gas. He led 25 laps and Timothy Peters got by Busch with 5 laps to go. With help from Ron Hornaday Jr. and Ryan Truex, Busch used a high-line move, to beat Peters by an inch for the win in a photo-finish.

Kyle Busch led some laps during the Daytona 500 and was running 4th on the final lap but got collected in an accident involving former arch-rival Kevin Harvick. Harvick apologized for causing the wreck, but he and Busch both called out the track for not having safer barriers in the front stretch. Busch hinted in a post-race interview that the wreck was the hardest impact he's ever had in a race car. Notably, he crossed his severely damaged car backward across the finish line on the pit road during the crash to finish 19th.

The next week at Phoenix, Busch ran second with 65 laps to go, but he and then leader Ryan Newman lost their shot at the win when they had to pit during an untimely caution. Despite this, Ryan Newman and Busch were able to recover to finish in the top ten.

On March 23, 2014, at Auto Club Speedway, Busch started 14th and was running fifth on the final restart. His older brother Kurt Busch appeared to have the win locked up, but Kurt and Tony Stewart got into an aggressive battle for the lead that resulted in Busch catching up to the leaders and passing for the win on the final lap. Busch held off rookie Kyle Larson for the win after passing Kurt Busch and Stewart.

At Richmond, Busch finished 3rd after an amazing charge from 16th place to 3rd in the final restart thanks to 4 fresh tires. At Talladega, Busch appeared to have a dominant car, but he was collected in a multi-car pileup caused when Brad Keselowski controversially raced aggressively while 6 laps down. Having seen Brad call out teammate Matt Kenseth for aggressive driving at Richmond the previous week, Busch and several other drivers were furious with Keselowski in their post-wreck interviews. Keselowski apologized for his role in the accident.

At Charlotte in the All-Star Race, Busch controlled the race early. He won $50,000 for winning segment No. 1 but got into an early accident in the second segment collecting Joey Logano. While racing hard with older brother Kurt, Kyle got into Clint Bowyer and spun out; came back down and was hit hard by Logano. It resembled his 2013 spring Kansas wreck. Busch famously climbed out and tried to walk to the infield hospital by himself to gain his composure but an ambulance picked him up escorting him to the hospital.

Kyle Busch also had an extremely good Nationwide series season where in 26 starts he would win 7 races and top 5 in 25 races finishing the season with an average finishing position of 2.8. He shared the No. 54 with Sam Hornish Jr. bringing the 54 to victory many times. Busch took the win at Phoenix holding off former rival Kevin Harvick. The rain delayed the race finish forcing it to be called official therefore giving Busch the win. He took the checkers at Bristol by holding off Kyle Larson in a re-run of the 2013 Bristol race. He then ended Joey Logano's Dover streak by winning the Dover NNS race on May 31, 2014, edging Trevor Bayne by 9 seconds (29 car-lengths) after a side-by-side battle with Bayne with 20–15 laps to go. At the Fall Richmond race Busch would win the race after every lap of the 250 lap race. Marking the second he had won an Xfinity Series race while leading every lap.

During the spring and early summer, Busch had great results in the truck series. In the first 5 races he entered he dominated and won. Busch led the most laps in 4 of the races. Four of the races were also won after starting on the pole.

In June 2014 Busch led 31 laps of the Quaker State 400 but got passed by Brad Keselowski with 16 laps to go. Busch finished second but said in an interview that after his 10-week streak of bad luck the runner-up felt like a win to him. The runner-up returned Busch to the top ten in points after being ranked 12th before the Kentucky event.

At Daytona Busch ran in the top ten all day long. However "the big one" struck after half-way into the race. Busch got clipped by Justin Allgaier and Denny Hamlin. He then got crushed and t-boned by Cole Whitt causing him to flip over onto his roof. Busch was mostly unscathed. Busch recovered from the bad finish by winning the pole a week later for the Camping World RV Sales 301, a race at a track he's finished second at many times and won in 2006. Busch finished second to Brad Keselowski.

At the Brickyard 400 Busch finished second for a second consecutive time while Jeff Gordon pulled away to win. He then had a streak of 4 races with 36th or less finishes. At Bristol Busch appeared to have a dominant car but got into a multi-car wreck on lap 117 after leading many laps. He then broke down because of axle issues. He and his crew chief David Rogers argued on their radios as Busch went to the garages with Rogers telling Busch to "take your whiny little ass to the bus." Rogers later apologized for his comments when it was figured out that Rogers only thought Busch was complaining because of miscommunication due to radio issues.

At Atlanta the next week Busch and Martin Truex Jr. wrecked while racing with 3 laps to go bringing out a caution. Busch and Truex exchanged heated words in the garages. Busch made the Chase for a second consecutive year. At Chicago Busch won the truck race despite 2 errors. Busch led 46 laps at Chicago and finished 7th.

Busch came to Kansas nervous, after a history of struggles and bad luck. Despite this, Busch won the Nationwide race, and finished 3rd in the Cup race the next day. His luck ran out just as the checkered flag fell, his engine expired immediately after the 400 miles were completed. Busch stated after the race that the third-place finish at his worst race-track felt like a championship to him.

Busch made it to the second round of the first elimination-format Chase and while he was 2nd in points coming in to Talladega, a crash on lap 103, where he was rear-ended by rookie Austin Dillon, eliminated him from contention due to a 40th-place finish which dropped him to 10th (below the 8th-place cutline).

Busch's results in the Chase spiraled downward after he did not make it to the next round but went on to finish 10th in the standings. He won a Nationwide race at Kansas and almost won a Nationwide race at Phoenix, but got passed by Brad Keselowski on the final lap. Busch's truck series operation won the most races in 2014 for the truck series and he won the owner's championship for a second consecutive time. When his truck driver/teammate Darrell Wallace Jr. celebrated the race win on the track, Wallace joined his buddy/boss on the front-stretch doing donuts together.

Busch finished 10th in the 2014 Cup series standings.

2015: First championship
Busch and crew chief Dave Rogers parted ways at the end of the 2014 season. In the offseason shuffle of crew chiefs, Busch was paired with his Xfinity Series crew chief Adam Stevens. Dave Rogers was transferred over to Denny Hamlin, while Hamlin's previous crew chief Darian Grubb was transferred over to newly recruited Carl Edwards. In late January 2015, Busch was accidentally criticized by Keith Olbermann for brother Kurt's domestic violence case, being mistaken for Kurt.

On February 10, 2015, Busch announced that he would skip the truck series race at Daytona to focus on racing in the Daytona 500. During the second Budweiser Duel, Busch dominated the first half of the race. However he was called for a stop-and-go-penalty for speeding exiting pit road. He restarted the second half of the race in 23rd spot. He came back to the front of the field within 15 laps of the penalty, finishing second behind former Hendrick Motorsports teammate Jimmie Johnson.

Daytona injury 
On February 21, 2015, Busch was involved in a multi-car accident with eight laps to go during the Xfinity Series race at Daytona International Speedway. The accident happened exiting the tri-oval, and Kyle Busch bounced off Kyle Larson and slid down into the infield grass and slammed into a concrete wall head-on that wasn't a SAFER barrier at an estimated speed of 90 mph, Busch climbed out of his race car with the help of medical and on-track officials. He laid on the ground before being placed on a stretcher as medical personnel attended to his right leg. He later was transported to Halifax Medical Center for further evaluation. A few hours later, the diagnosis was found to be a massive compound fracture in the lower right leg, a small fracture in the left foot, and a sprained left finger. Busch did receive a medical waiver by NASCAR, enabling him to run for the championship even with his injury layoff, so long as he could qualify under playoff rules.

Return and road to the championship
On May 12, 2015, Busch announced on Twitter that he would return to NASCAR at the Sprint All-Star Race at Charlotte on May 16, 2015. On June 13, 2015, nearly four months after his injury, he won the Xfinity Series race at Michigan in his second start of the season. In order to make the Chase in 2015, Busch needed to be in the Top 30 in points and have one win in the Sprint Cup Series.

On return to the Sprint Cup Series, Busch had an up-and-down season. In the Coca-Cola 600, he finished 11th. At Dover, he was running well until he was caught up in a late race crash and finished 36th. He then finished ninth at Pocono. At Michigan, Busch lost control of his car and cracked the wall, wrecking his car and finishing dead last. At Sonoma, Busch won after a late race caution put him on fresher tires than leader Jimmie Johnson. A few laps later, Busch was leading over brother Kurt Busch and Clint Bowyer. Their race against each other for second place allowed Busch to keep enough distance to hold first place. He had built up just enough time to come in first knowing that his brother had passed Bowyer and was quickly gaining on him.  On July 11, 2015, Busch won at Kentucky, making him only 87 points from breaking the top 30 in points, and be eligible to enter the Chase. It also denied Jeff Gordon's quest to win at least once on every active NASCAR tracks in his final season as a full-time driver. On July 19, 2015, Busch won at New Hampshire Motor Speedway, making him only 58 points from breaking the top 30 in points, and be eligible to enter the Chase. With 50 laps to go, Busch made a daring move on Brad Keselowski and Kevin Harvick to get his lap back, which resulted from a pit stop earlier in the race. A caution was later thrown, ultimately putting Busch in the lead with 44 laps to go, where he would not be challenged at all in the remaining laps. The race ended under caution when Alex Bowman smacked the wall off turn 2 as a result of a blown tire on the last lap. This was Busch's third victory in the past four races in the NASCAR Sprint Cup Series. He also fended off Brad Keselowski and Kevin Harvick for the win. In the next race at Indianapolis Motor Speedway, he won the prestigious Brickyard 400 and put himself 23 points behind the cutoff for the Chase for the Sprint Cup. He also completed the sweep for the weekend after winning the Xfinity race the day before and won three Cup Series races in a row for the first time in his career.

Busch clinched his spot in the Chase with one race left. Busch, with two top tens during the first round of the Chase advanced to round two. However his hopes to advance to the next round took a heavy hit during the race at Charlotte. After running second to teammate Matt Kenseth for most of the race, Busch and Kyle Larson collided while entering pit road, spinning Larson and eliminating both from contention for the race win. Busch hit the wall several times during the final 50 laps due to oil on the race-track from the No. 51 driven by Justin Allgaier who had lost a transmission after an on-track collision. After the race Busch and several other competitors such as Dale Earnhardt Jr. criticized NASCAR for allowing the drivers to race in oil during the final 50 laps.

Winning the championship

On November 15, 2015, Busch clinched a spot to stay in contention as the Championship Four for the final Chase at Homestead. On November 20, 2015, Kyle Busch Motorsports's Erik Jones won the Camping World Truck Series championship, making Busch the owners champion. He was named to the Championship 4, mainly competing against Jeff Gordon. On November 22, 2015, Busch won the Ford EcoBoost 400 to win his first ever Cup Series championship. Busch ended the season with five wins, twelve top fives, and sixteen top tens, despite racing in only 25 of 36 races.

2016: Second Championship Four Appearance 
Before the 2016 season started, Busch announced that he would no longer race in Xfinity or Camping World Truck Series restrictor plate races because of his Daytona crash in 2015. Busch started his season off with a 17th-place finish in the Sprint Unlimited, crashing with less than 5 laps left in the race. He won his Can-Am Duel and started on the front row of the Daytona 500 after his teammate Matt Kenseth, who qualified second for the 500, wrecked his car in the Duel and was forced to start from the back of the field. Busch finished 3rd in the 500. After the Daytona 500, Busch stated that he could "obtain 200 wins from all three national touring series combined" before he retires, which would tie Richard Petty's record. On February 27, 2016, Busch won the Xfinity Series' Heads Up Georgia 250 at Atlanta Motor Speedway. The next week, Busch led all but one lap at Las Vegas Motor Speedway to win the Boyd Gaming 300. That same race, he led his 16,000th career Xfinity Series lap just before a red flag came out around lap 163.

During the 2016 Kobalt 400, Busch was leading with 13 laps to go, and seemed to be the eventual winner, when he reported a vibration on his right front tire, thinking it was going to shred. He fell behind Brad Keselowski, Joey Logano, and Jimmie Johnson, finishing fourth at his hometown track. He had started 23rd in that same race. At Phoenix, Busch earned his third Xfinity Series win in a row, making it his 79th career victory (led 175 of 200 laps). The next day, he started on the pole at the Good Sam 500 and finished fourth.

While leading the final lap of the TreatMyClot.com 300 at Auto Club Speedway, Busch ran over a piece of debris, blowing his left front tire. He lost the lead to Joe Gibbs Racing teammate Daniel Suárez, who ran out of fuel, allowing Busch to re-take the lead on only three tires, though in the final corner, Austin Dillon was able to get by Busch and win the race. Kyle Busch made remarks about how NASCAR did not throw the caution, causing speculations that he had stated that NASCAR rigged the race. With his radio statements (plus refusing to do media and press interviews, as well as response to Austin Dillon claiming he tried to wreck him), Kyle Busch was fined $10,000 and was put on probation for 4 weeks. Busch rumorly apologized to NASCAR, yet was not confirmed.

After coming back from Easter/Spring Break and the incident at Auto Club, Kyle Busch started 2nd and finished 1st in the NASCAR Camping World Truck Series race at Martinsville, his first ever win at the track in any touring series (31st attempt). The next day, Busch started 7th, lead 352 of 500 laps, and won the 2016 STP 500 at Martinsville, sweeping the weekend and clinching a spot in the NASCAR Chase for the Sprint Cup. During the race interview, Kyle Busch called out skeptics and critics about him racing in the lower NASCAR series and how he doesn't deserve to win the races he had. His Truck win at Martinsville marked a milestone in which he had won a race in any of NASCAR's top 3 divisions at all 23 Sprint Cup tracks on the circuit, and his Cup win at Martinsville left him with just three tracks he has yet to win at; Charlotte Motor Speedway, Kansas Speedway, and Pocono Raceway (he would win at Kansas in the spring).

A week later, Busch swept at Texas Motor Speedway, winning the Xfinity and Cup races (O'Reilly Auto Parts 300 and Duck Commander 500), which sparked even more controversy with Sprint Cup drivers in the Xfinity and NCWTS. The Xfinity Cup win was his 80th overall in the series, and his 160th in all 3 top NASCAR touring series combined (which he extended at the Cup race at Texas the following day). The win in the Sprint Cup Series placed him 1st in the standings.

The next week at Bristol Motor Speedway, however, was brutal for Busch. Following a 2nd-place finish in the Xfinity race, he had a 38th-place finish in the Cup race due to multiple tire failures. The following week, Busch was passed by teammate Carl Edwards on the final lap at the Toyota Owners 400 at Richmond, finishing 2nd to him. At Talladega, Busch avoided several wrecks to finish second to Brad Keselowski. That race was his 400th career race, 1 day prior to his birthday. During post-race interviews, Busch showed his displeasure at NASCAR for racing at super-speedway tracks like Daytona and Talladega, stating "It sucks. I'd rather be at home." He and many other drivers would express their issues of safety and how they raced there due to 3 cars flipping upside-down and 4 "Big Ones", causing 35 of the 40 cars in the field to have damage or be involved in a crash.
At the Go Bowling 400 at Kansas, Busch led the final 40 laps on pit strategy to win the race ahead of former rival Kevin Harvick after affiliate driver Martin Truex Jr., the polesitter and dominant car of the race, like at Texas, had pit issues, failing to secure all 5 lug nuts in the pit stop. Martin Truex Jr. had to pit twice to fix the issue, resulting in a 14th-place finish. It was Busch's first win at Kansas, a track where he has had 4 DNFs and only 1 top 5 at prior to the start of the race, and he also became the first driver of 2016 to score three wins. He remained with 2 tracks he had yet to win at: Charlotte Motor Speedway and Pocono Raceway.

After his win at Kansas, Busch had a rough stretch of races, having 4 finishes of 30th or worse. After a 40th-place finish at Michigan, Busch and the #18 team regrouped during the off-week and got a solid 7th-place finish at Sonoma Raceway.

The following week at Daytona, Busch finished second to race winner Brad Keselowski. He finished second despite being in a backup car after a hard practice crash before qualifying. The next week at Kentucky Speedway, Busch won the Xfinity race at Kentucky. The following day in the Cup race, Busch finished 12th in the fuel mileage race, despite being in the top 5 late before pitting for fuel. The next week at New Hampshire, Busch once again won the Xfinity race. The next day, Busch led the most laps, but faltered on late restarts and finished 8th behind race winner and teammate Matt Kenseth.

The following week at Indianapolis Motor Speedway, Busch made NASCAR history as the first driver to sweep both poles and both races in the same weekend at the same track. In the Xfinity Series Lilly Diabetes 250, Busch dominated the race leading almost every lap and winning the race from the pole. It was his third Xfinity Series victory in a row and 83rd victory in the series. The following day in the Brickyard 400, Busch dominated the race, leading 149 of the 170 laps and after surviving several late restarts, Busch won his second consecutive Brickyard 400. It was his 38th career Cup Series victory, 4th victory of the year, and 2nd career victory at Indianapolis.

Busch dominated the Bristol race in August. He led 57% of the whole race leading for 252 of the first 419 laps. However, Busch began having handling problems during the final quarter of the race and it was enough to send him to the garages. On his way to the garages, however, Busch got t-boned by a crashing Justin Allgaier, driving a one-off race for HScott Motorsports, taking him out of the race. Busch expressed discontent with Allgaier and Allgaier's spotter in his post-race interview, calling them "The biggest morons out there."

Busch went on to make the Championship Four at Homestead-Miami Speedway and finish third in the standings. Jimmie Johnson won his 7th NASCAR Sprint Cup Series championship.

2017: Third Championship Four Appearance 

Busch started the 2017 season on a slow note when he wrecked in the Daytona 500 after his rear tire lost air, spinning him and collecting race leader Dale Earnhardt Jr. In his interview, Busch criticized Goodyear's tires, saying they "aren't very good at holding air."

In the Kobalt 400 at Las Vegas, Busch collided with Joey Logano as the two battled for a top-five finish on the final lap. The contact spun Busch out and onto pit road, relegating him to 22nd, while Logano finished fourth. After the race, Busch confronted Logano on pit road. Before words could be exchanged, Busch threw a punch, but it is unclear if the punch landed. Logano and his crew then quickly took Busch to the ground. Busch suffered a bloody forehead in the brawl. "I got dumped, flat-out dumped," Busch stated in a post-race interview. "He just drove straight into the corner and wrecked me. That's how Joey races so, he's gonna get it." Neither driver was penalized for the fight. The following week at Phoenix, Busch led a race-high 114 laps and was in position to win before Logano's tire blew with five laps to go to bring out the caution. For the final restart, Ryan Newman stayed out and went on to win, while Busch finished third. Busch finished 8th the next week at Auto Club Speedway. He then led a race-high 274 laps the following week at Martinsville but finished 2nd to Brad Keselowski. Kyle Busch won the exhibition All Star Race held at Charlotte Motor Speedway on May 20, and followed it up with his then best finish in the Coca-Cola 600 coming in 2nd-place. At Indianapolis, Busch looked to defend the previous year's Brickyard 400 win. He won the first two stages easily, but when he decided to race Truex for the lead in the third stage, starting second, the two slammed into the wall, ending both drivers' days. Busch had led 1,000+ laps in 2017 coming to the second Pocono race in July, where he had yet to win. He started on the pole, led the most laps, and retook the lead from Kevin Harvick for his 39th career victory. It was his first at Pocono and left Charlotte Motor Speedway as the only track where Busch had yet to win at in the Cup Series. On August 19, Busch swept the weekend at Bristol Motor Speedway. He won all stages in the truck race on Wednesday and did the same in the Xfinity Series race on Friday. Busch would go on to win the Cup race on Saturday night after holding off a hard charging Erik Jones, who up to that point was dominating the race. Busch would go on to accomplish his second Bristol sweep. He later went on to help teammate Hamlin win the Southern 500 two weeks later.

Busch made the renamed "Playoffs" with his two wins. He won the pole at Chicagoland before finishing out of the top five due to a pit road penalty. The following week, Busch won the 2017 ISM Connect 300 (The last Fall Race at New Hampshire before New Hampshire's 2nd Race moved to Las Vegas in 2018) from the pole, and leading the most laps. The win caused him to advance to the next round of the playoffs. Busch won for the second consecutive week at Dover after passing Chase Elliott coming to the white flag. Busch held off Toyota teammate Truex as they came to the line and the field wrecking behind them and recorded his 2nd-career Martinsville victory just 3 races later and made it to the final four in Homestead. He was unable to get by Martin Truex Jr. in the closing laps resulting in a second-place finish in the race and in the final point standings.

2018: First Official Regular Season Title, Fourth Championship Four Appearance 

Busch's quest for redemption began at the 2018 Daytona 500, Busch wrecked after blowing a tire; however, he was able to make it down to pit road to fix his car, finishing in 25th place. Busch was able to win the truck series race at Las Vegas in his first time competing there in the truck series since 2001. With the win, Busch has now won at his home track in all 3 major touring series of NASCAR. Busch followed the win with back to back runner up finishes at Las Vegas and Phoenix in the cup series to Kevin Harvick, even leading the most laps in the latter. He later finished third at Auto Club Speedway to Martin Truex Jr. and finished second at Martinsville to Clint Bowyer. Busch won his first race of the season at Texas in April. He followed that win with another win at Bristol on a Monday after using a bump and run against Kyle Larson in the closing laps.

Busch won his third straight race at Richmond after starting the race in 32nd, marking the first time he has won three in a row since July 2015 when he won Kentucky, New Hampshire, and the Brickyard 400 at Indianapolis. Next at Talladega, he went as high as second, but went on to finish 13th. At the Coca-Cola 600 at Charlotte in May, Busch dominated the race and scored his first career win at Charlotte, making him the first driver to win a race at every racetrack in the Monster Energy NASCAR Cup Series at which he has competed. The next week at Pocono, Busch led the most laps and won the Xfinity Series race, meaning he has now won at every active Xfinity Series track he has competed at. 3 weeks later Kyle Busch battled Kyle Larson for the win at Chicagoland with a Bump & Run on the No. 42 of Larson with Busch completing the run for the win. At Daytona, Busch, was turned by Ricky Stenhouse Jr. resulting in a 33rd-place finish. Two weeks after Daytona, at New Hampshire, Busch, was moved in the final laps by Harvick having Busch finish 2nd. The next week Busch started at the back in 27th but finished 4th in Stage 1, then used pit strategy at before the end of Stage 2 to get in front of the dominate car of Kevin Harvick (who also started at the rear) and then held off Daniel Suárez to win his 6th race of the year and second straight summer race at Pocono. In the final pit stop for the 18 team during Watkins Glen, the gas can had a malfunction to where fuel wasn't put into the car and forced Busch to pit before the green flag putting him as the last car on the lead lap. He rebounded to a 3rd-place finish. In the first laps of the Bristol Night race, a caution came out for Busch who spun exiting turn 4. After spending most of the race picking up laps, fixing the damage, and being 2 laps down, Busch was able to contend up in the Top 5. However, after an incident with Truex Jr. and later on Jimmie Johnson and Chris Buescher, he finished 20th. After the Brickyard 400 in September, which was the Regular Season Finale for the first time, he easily won the 2018 Regular Season Championship. Busch finally won his 50th career Cup Series race at Richmond. With the 50th win, Kyle Busch is the only driver in NASCAR history to reach 50+ wins in all 3 of the top touring series. After making it to the round of 8, Busch went on to win at Phoenix (ISM Raceway) for the first time since his rookie season in 2005, and secured his spot in the championship 4. He would go on to finish 4th in the final standings, with Joey Logano winning the championship.

2019: Second championships, 200th Win Across All three National Series

Busch started the season with a 2nd-place finish in the Daytona 500, along with Truck Series wins at Atlanta, Las Vegas and Texas and Xfinity Series wins at Las Vegas, ISM Raceway, Texas, and Indianapolis.

His first Cup series win of the season came early in the fourth race of the schedule at ISM Raceway. The following race, Busch won his 200th event across NASCAR's top three touring divisions at Auto Club Speedway after sweeping both the stages and leading the most laps. His final two Truck events at Martinsville and Charlotte saw him able to win those to be undefeated having won in all 5 races he ran. After being drilled in the back end in the early laps at Bristol, he held off his brother Kurt for his 8th win there, and tied Rusty Wallace's win total of 55 after winning the Pocono 400 at Pocono.

In July at Kentucky Speedway, his brother Kurt held him off in a shootout finish that saw the two side by side for the win. The elder Busch prevailed, and was the third time the brothers finished 1–2 in a Cup race. He stayed consistent throughout the whole entire summer to catch up with Logano for the Regular Season Championship. Following the 2019 Bojangles' Southern 500 at Darlington Raceway, Busch clinched his second consecutive Regular Season Championship with a third-place finish despite cutting a tire with less than 3 laps to go racing for the win, and riding the wall to finish. Despite an engine blow to end the day at Indianapolis, Busch claimed his second consecutive Regular Season Championship and ended it with 21 top 10 finishes.

Busch's playoffs was up and down. Las Vegas was mediocre as he wrecked a lapped car without avoiding it and finished 19th. Richmond was a rebound race as he was looking to win the race, but eventually got passed by Martin Truex Jr and wounded 2nd. He once again had a suspension issue at the Charlotte ROVAL and finished 37th. Despite that, the Round Of 12 looked more confident as he consistently finished in the top 6 at Dover. Things took a turn at Talladega as he got side-drafted by Stenhouse and wrecked causing the Big One and finished the race in the top 20. With all the bonus points and playoff points, he finished 3rd at Kansas Speedway to make it to the Round of 8. At Martinsville however, he had a run-in with Aric Almirola which gave him some damage and finished 14th as a result. After the race, it looked as though Almirola would end his playoff hopes. But it didn't happen as after finishing in the top 10 at Texas and a runner-up to his credit at ISM Raceway, he made the Championship 4 for the 5th season in a row. He then was 4th heading to Homestead as the underdog. After the green flag dropped, Busch dominated part of the race and won at Homestead for his second championship and won his second race at Homestead. This was his 5th win of the season, snapping A 21-race winless streak. In the process, his 2019 season saw him earn 5 wins, 17 top 5s, 27 top 10s, 1 pole, 1,582 laps led, an average finish of 8.9, and finished the season as the Monster Energy NASCAR Cup Series Champion. He also won both the Regular Season Championship and the Playoffs for the first time in his career.

2020: Championship Hangover
Busch started the 2020 season with a 34th-place finish at the 2020 Daytona 500 after blowing an engine; he was the only driver to drop out at the red flag for a lap 185 Big One who was not part of the actual wreck.

On February 22, 2020, after Busch won the Las Vegas Truck race, Kevin Harvick and Camping World CEO Marcus Lemonis offered a 100,000 reward to any full-time Cup Series driver who can beat Busch in the Truck Series. Corey LaJoie, Austin Dillon, Landon Cassill, and Timmy Hill were among those who showed interest in the challenge. Chase Elliott later won the race and the bounty. Busch qualified for the playoffs on points and was eliminated after the round of 12.

A big talking point concerning Kyle Busch throughout 2020 was his failure to win for most of the season. By the time the playoff race at Texas Motor Speedway came around, Busch had been eliminated. Amid heavy discussion around his 15-season win streak possibly ending, Busch led 90 laps and stretched his fuel to take his first (and only) win of the 2020 season, snapping a 33 race winless streak dating back to his championship winning race in Homestead-Miami at the conclusion of the 2019 season. He finished 8th in the final points standings.

2021: 100 Career Xfinity wins

Busch started the season with a win at the Busch Clash, after leaders Chase Elliott and Ryan Blaney tangled on the final lap. He finished 14th at the 2021 Daytona 500 after a fiery last-lap crash took out multiple cars, where he was hit in the driver's side by Austin Cindric. He seemed to be uninjured and was quickly released from the infield care center. On his 36th birthday, Busch won at Kansas, winning for the second time on his birthday, and joining Cale Yarborough by winning on their birthday not once, but twice. The win also extended his streak to 17 consecutive seasons with at least one win, tying David Pearson for second, while Richard Petty holds the record at 18. Busch scored his second win at the Pocono doubleheader race 2, despite suffering a broken transmission and racing in 4th gear. At New Hampshire, Busch was leading when rain showered the track, causing him and teammates Denny Hamlin, and Martin Truex Jr. to crash. He showed his anger to NASCAR for letting them start the race when they knew the race was being threatened by rain. Busch ended up finishing dead last in 37th.

Busch's two wins once again landed him in the playoffs. After crashing at Darlington, a frustrated Busch ran over several safety cones and nearly hit some people on his way to the garage, landing him a $50,000 fine. Following a late-race incident with longtime rival Brad Keselowski at Martinsville that denied him a spot in the championship four, Busch used the word "retarded" when describing the incident with Keselowski, leading NASCAR to have him undergo mandatory sensitivity training in advance of the next season. He finished the season 9th in the points standings.

In his final Xfinity Series run, Busch won all five of his races he attempted, including his 100th career series win at Nashville.

2022: Final Year with Joe Gibbs Racing

Busch started the 2022 season with a second place finish at the 2022 Busch Light Clash at The Coliseum, losing to Joey Logano after leading 65 of the exhibition race's 150 laps. He finished sixth at the 2022 Daytona 500. Busch won the Bristol dirt race after Tyler Reddick and Chase Briscoe collided with each other for the lead on the final lap. His run at Darlington ended abruptly when Brad Keselowski blew a tire and collided with him. Busch parked his car on pit road and walked off when its front suspension was too damaged for the car to return to the garage. Busch was leading that year's Texas All-Star race when a tire went down and caused him to slow on the track. Busch got hit by Ross Chastain, who nearly flipped off of Busch. The crash also collected Chase Elliott. Everyone, including Busch, was uninjured. Busch finished second at Pocono, but was disqualified and the No. 18 team was served an L1 penalty after a post-race inspection revealed an alteration to the car's front fascia. It was revealed that the lower corners and wheel openings of the front fascia were wrapped with a layer of clear vinyl that was not removed prior to the application of the paint scheme wrap, resulting in a slight irregularity in the car's dimensions. At the Southern 500, Busch led a race-best 155 laps before his engine expired during the final caution, resulting in a 30th place finish. Busch was eliminated in the Round of 16 after another engine failure at the Bristol night race. On October 18, Beshore was suspended for four races for a loose wheel violation at Las Vegas. Busch finished the season 13th in the points standings, his first points finish outside the top 10 since 2012.

In his part-time Truck Series run, Busch scored three top-three finishes and earned a win at Sonoma Raceway.

On December 20, 2021, Mars, Incorporated had announced that they would depart from NASCAR after the 2022 season, which left Busch and the No. 18 without a primary sponsor in 2023. After JGR and Toyota failed to secure a replacement for Mars, it was reported that Busch would depart from the team and manufacturer after 15 seasons. On September 13, 2022, Busch announced that he had signed with Richard Childress Racing to drive the No. 8 in 2023, returning to Chevrolet for the first time since 2007, and brought Kyle Busch Motorsports with him.

Richard Childress Racing: 2023-present

2023
Busch began the 2023 season with a 19th place finish at the 2023 Daytona 500. A week later, he scored his first win with RCR and 61st career victory at Fontana.

Notes

References

2001 beginnings
2000s in NASCAR
2010s in NASCAR
2020s in NASCAR
Busch, Kyle
Kyle Busch
Busch, Kyle
Busch, Kyle
Busch, Kyle